"Love, Blactually" is the first episode in the seventh season of the American animated television series Family Guy. It originally aired on Fox in the United States on September 28, 2008. The episode features anthropomorphic dog Brian as he meets a fellow atheist named Carolyn (Kat Foster) at a book store, and the two begin dating. Heeding advice from Stewie (also voiced by MacFarlane), Brian decides not to have sex with her. Carolyn is led to believe that Brian does not want a substantive relationship, so she begins to date Cleveland (Mike Henry). The episode was originally slated to air during season six on March 2, 2008, but was replaced with Play It Again, Brian for unknown reasons.

The episode was written by Henry, and directed by Cyndi Tang. It received generally positive reviews from critics for its storyline. According to Nielsen ratings, it was watched by 9.2 million viewers in its original airing. The episode featured guest performances by Foster and Meredith Baxter, along with several recurring voice actors from the series. "Love, Blactually" was released on DVD along with eight other episodes from the season on June 16, 2009.

Plot
During a costume party, Lois suggests Brian to find a girlfriend. After going to the bookstore to buy The God Delusion, Brian meets an atheist named Carolyn, who happens to be looking for the same book. Brian becomes interested in Carolyn, and the two begin to date. When she invites him to her house, Stewie apprehends Brian and tells him that his relationships fail because he has sex with his girlfriends immediately when they meet. Brian realizes that Stewie is right and decides to listen to his advice. However, he finds out that Carolyn has begun to date Cleveland, since Brian did not want to have sex for the three weeks they have dated, and assumed he just wanted to be friends. A heartbroken Brian tries to deal with his loss, but keeps running into Cleveland and Carolyn having sex in various locations. Blaming Stewie for his advice that cost him a relationship with Carolyn, Brian is about ready to give up on love. Apologizing for his botched attempt to help him out, Stewie suggests that he can convince Cleveland's ex-wife, Loretta, to reconcile with him.

The two visit Loretta in her own home and find out that she feels guilty for cheating on him with Quagmire, and believes she can never go back to Cleveland. Later, Cleveland visits Brian to clear any negative feeling he has against him and Carolyn, as they are at "a point of great soreness", but then Cleveland announces to Brian that he plans to elope with Carolyn in Hawaii, which makes their friendship tense. Just as Cleveland leaves, Loretta appears out of nowhere. Loretta apologizes to Cleveland for her affair with Quagmire, she then announces that she wants to get their family back together and promises she'll never betray him again. Cleveland goes to Peter and Lois for advice on what should be done. Peter and Lois think Cleveland shouldn't go back to Loretta, but Brian (seeing this as his only chance at getting back with Carolyn) says Cleveland should "forgive and forget", and points out Loretta's good qualities (which he's obviously lying, as his nose starts to grow). Peter suspects that Brian is lying and points out that she can't be trusted after what she did. Cleveland decides to talk to Loretta tomorrow to see how he feels about getting back together with her. Thinking Loretta hasn't changed and suspecting that Brian was using her to sabotage his chances to be with Carolyn, Peter recruits Quagmire to have sex with Loretta again so Cleveland can see she hasn't changed. Quagmire meets her at the hotel she's staying in, but this time, Loretta resists his advances and tells him to beat it after smashing him in the face with an iron. When Cleveland shows up to her hotel room, Cleveland forgives her, but insists that it is time for the both of them to move on while Loretta lives her life as amazing and wonderful as she can. Cleveland finally leaves as Loretta tearfully watches on. When Cleveland visits Carolyn, he finds her and Quagmire having sex, apparently the same way it happened to Brian. Since both Brian and Cleveland have been cheated on by the same woman, Cleveland apologizes to him for stealing Carolyn and they make amends, with the former revealing himself to have received a genital wart.

Production

"Love, Blactually" is the season premiere of the seventh season of Family Guy. It was written by one of the show's main voice actors, Mike Henry, in his first episode of the season. The episode dealt a lot with the character of Cleveland Brown, which is one of the characters for which Henry provides the voice. The episode was directed by Cyndi Tang, who has been with the show since its fifth season. Series regulars Peter Shin and James Purdum served as supervising directors for the episode. The episode is one of the last to concentrate on the character of Cleveland, since he would be moved to The Cleveland Show (which Henry co-created).

"Love, Blactually", along with the first eight episodes of the seventh season were released on DVD by 20th Century Fox Home Entertainment in the United States and Canada on June 16, 2009, one month after it had completed broadcast on television. The "Volume 7" DVD release features bonus material including deleted scenes, animatics, and commentaries for every episode.

In addition to the regular cast, actress Kat Foster portrayed the voice of Carolyn, and actress Meredith Baxter portrayed herself. Recurring voice actors Ralph Garman, writer Danny Smith, writer Alec Sulkin, and writer John Viener also made minor appearances. Then-series writer and regular voice actress Alex Borstein portrayed the voice of Loretta Brown.

Cultural references

The episode begins with a costume party, where Brian and Stewie are both dressed as Snoopy from Peanuts, Quagmire dresses up as Napoleon Dynamite, Peter as Laura Bush, Lois as Michael Dutton Douglas, Joe as Mark Spitz (although people believe he is a crippled Thomas Magnum), and Cleveland as Charlie Chaplin. Woodstock, another character from Peanuts also makes a cameo appearance. The popular conversation between Stewie and Brian which draws attention to a hard "h" consonant sound is directly sourced from dialogue within the film Hot Rod. Stewie finds a book entitled Horton Hears Domestic Violence in the Next Apartment and Doesn't Call 911!, a parody of Horton Hears a Who! Cleveland's deadpan exclamation of "...and boom goes the dynamite" is a reference to the popular catchphrase which became an Internet sensation. Cleveland and Carolyn meet at a Starbucks. Peter doesn't remember the name of Cleveland's ex-wife (Loretta) and he guesses that it's Jennifer Hudson.

Reception
The episode was watched by 9.2 million viewers, compared to 9.3 million that tuned in to The Simpsons and 7 million that watched King of the Hill for their season openers on Fox. The episode received positive reviews. Ahsan Haque of IGN praised "Love, Blactually", writing that it had "many memorable scenes, quote-worthy dialogue, politically incorrect references, and great storyline". He graded the episode 8.9 out of 10. Steve Heisler of The A.V. Club wrote that the episode was "pretty funny overall" with "some great meta-commentary", and graded it B+. In contrast Robin Pierson of The TV Critic gave the episode a negative review, saying that Family Guy has become like the shows it mocked in its earlier seasons and he ended his review by stating that it has become "predictable, stale and irritating to watch" and he gave it a 29 out of a possible 100.

References

External links
 

Family Guy (season 7) episodes
2008 American television episodes